The Mount Tucuche tree frog (Flectonotus fitzgeraldi) is a species of tree frog in the family Hemiphractidae. It is found in Trinidad and Tobago and Paria Peninsula, Venezuela. It is an arboreal species occurring in various microhabitats of humid montane forest: leaf bases of bromeliads and aroids, bushes. It is threatened by habitat loss.

This species is named after Leslie Desmond Foster Vesey-Fitzgerald who worked on Trinidad and Tobago in the early 1930s.

References

Flectonotus
Amphibians of Trinidad and Tobago
Amphibians of Venezuela
Taxonomy articles created by Polbot
Amphibians described in 1933